The 2021 City of Wolverhampton Council Election took place on 6 May 2021 to elect members of City of Wolverhampton Council in England. This was on the same day as other local elections. One-third of the seats were up for election.

Results

Ward results

Bilston East 

Thomas Fellows stood in the previous election for the UK Independence Party.

Bilston North

Blakenhall

Bushbury North

Bushbury South and Low Hill

East Park

Ettingshall

Fallings Park

Graiseley

Heath Town

Merry Hill

Oxley

Park

Penn

Spring Vale

St Peters

Tettenhall Regis

Tettenhall Wightwick

Wednesfield North

Wednesfield South

By-elections

East Park

References 

City of Wolverhampton
Wolverhampton City Council elections
2020s in the West Midlands (county)